Ranney may refer to:

People
Ambrose Ranney (1821–1899), Massachusetts politician
Art Ranney, co-founder (1920) of the American Professional Football Association (now the National Football League)
Helen Ranney (1920–2010), American physician who researched sickle-cell anemia
J. Austin Ranney (1920–2006), American political scientist
Karen Ranney, American author of historical romance novels
Rufus P. Ranney (1813–1891), Ohio politician
Waitstill R. Ranney (1791–1853), Vermont physician and politician
William Ranney (1813–1857), American painter

Other
Neighborhood of Pleasant Prairie, Wisconsin
Ranney Bridge, bridge in Essex County, New York
Ranney collector, type of radial well
Ranney Index, United States political measurement
Ranney Nunatak, Antarctic nunatak
Ranney School, private New Jersey school

See also
Rainey
Raney